Pseudotrechisibus sphaericus is a species of beetle in the family Carabidae, the only species in the genus Pseudotrechisibus.

References

Trechinae